The 2019 South American U-15 Championship is an international football tournament that will be held in Paraguay from 23 November to 8 December 2019. The twelve national teams involved in the tournament (all 10 CONMEBOL member national teams and 2 invited UEFA teams) were required to register a squad of 22 players; only players in these squads are eligible to take part in the tournament.

All registered players had to have been born on or after 1 January 2004. The age listed for each player is on 23 November 2019, the first day of the tournament.

Group A

Bolivia 
Head coach: Christian Ocampo

The 22-man squad was announced on 13 November 2019.

Brazil 
Head coach: Paulo Victor Gomes

The 22-man squad was announced on 18 October 2019.

Colombia 
Head coach: Jorge Serna

The 22-man squad was announced on 18 November 2019.

Peru 
Head coach: Édgar Teixeira

The 22-man squad was announced on 17 November 2019.

Belgium 
Head coach: Bob Browaeys

The 22-man squad was announced on 20 November 2019.

Venezuela 
Head coach: Frank Piedrahita

The 22-man squad was announced on 16 November 2019.

Group B

Argentina 
Head coach: Alejandro Saggese

The 22-man squad was announced on 13 November 2019.

Uruguay 
Head coach: Diego Demarco

The 22-man squad was announced on 29 October 2019.

Chile 
Head coach: Hugo Balladares

The 22-man squad was announced on 9 November 2019.

Poland 
Head coach: Dariusz Gęsior

The 22-man squad was announced on 4 November 2019.

Paraguay 
Head coach: Delio Toledo

The 22-man squad was announced on 2 November 2019.

Ecuador 
Head coach: Eduardo Moscoso

References 

2019